Arthur Woodley may refer to:
Art Woodley (died 30 May 1990, aged 84), founder of Woodley Airways
Arthur Woodley (bass opera singer), sang in 2013 premiere of Champion (opera)